The saddled snake-eel (Leiuranus semicinctus, also known commonly as the halfbanded snake-eel, the banded snake eel, or the culverin) is an eel in the family Ophichthidae (worm/snake eels). It was described by George Tradescant Lay and Edward Turner Bennett in 1839, originally under the genus Ophisurus. It is a marine, tropical eel which is known from the Indo-Pacific and southeastern Atlantic Ocean, including East and South Africa, the Hawaiian Islands, the Marquesan Islands, the Mangaréva islands, Japan, and Australia.

The saddled snake-eel's diet consists of fish, crabs, prawns, and worms including Ptychodera. Males and females rise to the surface of the water during spawning.

References

Ophichthidae
Fish described in 1839